Scream (formerly known as It's A Scream) was a student-oriented pub chain in the United Kingdom owned by the Stonegate Pub Company. The chain began in October 1995.

History

The pub chain was set up by brewers Bass, who called it, It's a Scream. The pubs were all within relatively short walking distance of a university.

Bass's retail arm became Mitchells & Butlers in April 2003.

Scream was disposed of by Mitchells and Butlers on 20 August 2010, along with around 300 other Mitchells and Butlers pubs for £373m to Stonegate (owned by TDR Capital).

Theme 
Scream pubs were aimed at the student market, and mostly found near to universities. They claimed to be 'the number one choice of students'. Its chief competitor was Varsity, owned at the time by the Barracuda Group, although Varsity had a more mainstream market – often concentrating on football matches on Sky Sports and located closer to town centres. Varsity became part of Stonegate in 2013.

The original name came from the 1893 painting The Scream, by the Norwegian artist Edvard Munch, which is a popular poster image with many students. The painting was formerly shown on some pub signs of the former It's A Scream chain.

The pubs each had individual items, for example a giant monkey mural (Horn in Hand), a talking moose's head (White Harte, Bristol), an aardvark costume (The Aardvark, Coventry) or a large painting of a Phoenix (The Phoenix, Coventry) and their own sign relating to their name. Some went further, such as the Dry Dock in Leeds and Leicester which were built inside an old grounded ship.

Scream pubs had a loyalty card scheme known as The Yellow Card. It was available to students annually for £1 (originally free) and entitled them to discounts on selected food and drink. In November 2006, selected Scream Pubs had been chosen to run a trial wherein they did not sell Yellow Cards.

With the introduction of the new Scottish Licensing Laws on 1 September 2009, Yellow Cards purchased in Scream pubs in Scotland would not be valid until 72 hours after purchase.

In the Summer of 2003, Scream introduced the "Yellow Card For Life" – costing £5, with the promise that it will never expire.

Former locations
There were 50 Scream pubs spread around the UK when Stonegate took over the chain, with the vast majority being in towns and cities with a significant student population.

 Scotland
 Aberdeen (2)
The Bobbin
Triplekirks
 Dundee (1)
The Nether Inn
 Edinburgh (1)
The Tron
 Glasgow (3)
The Ark
The Hall
Curlers

 North-East
 Middlesbrough (3)
The Southfield
The Camel's Hump
The Crown
 Durham
The New Inn

 Yorkshire
 Huddersfield (1)
The Warehouse
 Hull (2)
Piper Club
The Haworth Arms
 Leeds (2)
The Dry Dock
The Library
 Sheffield (2)
The Cavendish
The Globe
 York (1)
The Keystones
 Bradford (1)
Delius
 Grimsby (1)
The Wheatsheaf

 North-West
 Lancaster (2)
Keystones 
The Friary
 Liverpool (2)
The Brookhouse
The Hope and Anchor
 Manchester (2)
The Footage
The Pub/Zoo
 Preston (2)
Roper Hall
The Adelphi

 East Midlands
 Derby (1)
The Friary
 Leicester (4)
POLAR BEAR
The Dry Dock
The Loaded Dog
Soar Point
 Loughborough (1)
The Phantom
 Northampton (1)
The Penny Whistle
 Nottingham (1)
The Horn in Hand

 West Midlands
 Birmingham (3)
The Bristol Pear
The Gosta Green
The Hare of the Dog
 Coventry (2)
The Aardvark
The Phoenix
 Leamington Spa (1)
Robbins Well
 Wolverhampton (1)
The Royal London

 East of England
 Southend-on-Sea (1)
The Alex
 London (1)
The Auctioneer

 South-East
 Canterbury (1)
The Penny Theatre
 Oxford (1)
The City Arms
 Reading (2)
Pavlovs Dog
Upin Arms

 Southampton (1)
The Avondale

 South-West
 Bristol (2)
The Cider Press (previously The Rising Sun)
The White Harte
 Bournemouth (1)
The Inferno
 Cheltenham (1)
The Pulpit
 Plymouth (1)
The Roundabout

 Wales
 Bangor (1)
The Old Glan
 Cardiff (2)
The George
The Woodville
Gassy Jacks

Closures 
One of the first scream bars to close was "The India Arms" in Portsmouth during the early 2000s, the pub was sold to Enterprise Inns where it currently trades as "The Italian Bar and Grill". Another scream bar in Portsmouth, The Registry closed at the end of March 2010.  It was renamed The Kraken Wakes as part of an ongoing partnership between independent pub operator Fiveeightzero and the owner, Mitchells & Butlers. It opened at the end of April 2010 following a refurbishment. The new name was short lived, as the establishment reverted to the original name of The Registry in March 2011. However, It closed once again on 1 June 2014 and was converted into student halls of residence, which opened in September 2015.

'The Queen of Hearts' and 'The Cheshire Cat' in Fallowfield, Manchester, were never sold by Mitchells and Butlers in late 2010. They still operated as Scream Pub, but all branding had to be removed. As of 15 April 2011, The pub has been sold to Hydes Pub Company, and is now a Hydes pub.

'Robinskis' in Fallowfield was taken over by Stonegate in late 2010. Due to various disputes within the company regarding profits and poor management remained for sale from its purchase by Stonegate until 6 May 2011, when the pub was finally sold to an independent owner, and was reopened as Nayaab Indian Restaurant.

Scream had 67 pubs under its name at the time of Sale. Stonegate bought 62 of these pubs. The other five stayed under Michells and Butlers until they were sold on to other buyers. Since Stonegate have taken over, the following 14 pubs have been sold by Stonegate:

 The Junction in Harrow
 The Kinston Mill in Kingston upon Thames
 The Robbins Well in Leamington Spa
 The Quayside in Lincoln
 The Park in Luton
 Robinskis in Manchester
 The Phoenix in Manchester
 The Queen of Hearts and The Cheshire Cat in Manchester
 The Lot in Richmond

Common Room

Starting with the Southfield, Stonegate began converting existing Scream sites to a new 'Common Room' brand, rather than branding each site as a uniform segment, instead brands each site individually. The sites focus more on casual dining and an emerging interest in craft beer. Typically sites having converted to the new brand saw an increase in sales of roughly 60%, with success based on a change to multiple visits by customers during the day.

References

External links 

 Stonegate Pub Company

British companies established in 1995
Companies based in Luton
Companies based in Birmingham, West Midlands
Restaurants established in 1995
Pub chains
Stonegate Pub Company
Student culture